Beaconsfield station may refer to:

Beaconsfield station (MBTA) in Brookline, Massachusetts, United States
Beaconsfield station (RTM) in Montreal, Quebec, Canada
Beaconsfield railway station (England) in Beaconsfield, Buckinghamshire, England
Beaconsfield railway station, Melbourne, in Melbourne, Victoria, Australia
Beaconsfield Station Sheep Wash, in Ilfracombe, Queensland, Australia

See also
Beaconsfield (disambiguation)